John Horace Panizza (24 March 1931 – 31 January 1997) was an Australian politician. Born at Southern Cross, Western Australia, he was a farmer and property developer, and served on Yilgarn Shire Council. In 1987, he was elected to the Australian Senate as a Liberal Senator for Western Australia. He held his Senate seat until his death in 1997; Ross Lightfoot was appointed to replace him.

References

Liberal Party of Australia members of the Parliament of Australia
Members of the Australian Senate for Western Australia
Members of the Australian Senate
1931 births
1997 deaths
People from Southern Cross, Western Australia
Australian politicians of Italian descent
Western Australian local councillors
20th-century Australian politicians